Seven: The Days Long Gone is an open world science-fantasy-themed role-playing video game developed by IMGN.PRO and Fool's Theory. It was released on 1 December 2017, and has been released on Steam, GOG.com and Humble.

The game does not have one clear genre, with Brendon Calswell from Rock Paper Shotgun calling it a mix of "cyberpunk or technofantasy". It is played from an isometric perspective. The player character is a thief, and gameplay elements are reminiscent of Thief and Assassin's Creed, with stealth, assassination and rooftop parkour. The game contains music by Miracle of Sound and Marcin Przybyłowicz, who also collaborated to provide music for the game's trailer.

It was nominated for "Best Original Soundtrack Album" at the 16th Annual Game Audio Network Guild Awards.

References 

Open-world video games
Role-playing video games
Video games with isometric graphics
Unreal Engine games
Retrofuturistic video games
Cyberpunk video games
Video games scored by Marcin Przybyłowicz